Golden Eagle is an unincorporated community in Calhoun County, Illinois, United States. Golden Eagle had its own post office until October 22, 2011; it still has its own ZIP Code, 62036.

References

Unincorporated communities in Calhoun County, Illinois
Unincorporated communities in Illinois